Mark Neilson Mañosca Coleta (born August 4, 1991), popularly known as Neil Coleta, is a Filipino actor and TV host. He appeared in the TV series Growing Up and 100 Days to Heaven.

Personal life
Coleta graduated from Adamson University. In 2013, his car was hit by another vehicle along Commonwealth Avenue in Quezon City while he was on his way home.

In 2021, Coleta will be having a daughter with partner ChinKee Brice.

Career
Coleta started his career in showbiz industry in the Philippines in 2008 and later culminated in 2011. He debuted as a part of the cast of the TV5 show Lipgloss as Caloy Borongan. In 2011, he was later known for doing a television advertisement for Nestea which became publicly recalled by its audience.

Since then, he had done several television projects with ABS-CBN.

In 2012, Coleta starred the film I Do Bidoo Bidoo: Heto nAPO Sila! having a gay role. His work for the film garnered several reviews that made him winning the "New Movie Actor of the Year Award" from the 29th PMPC Star Awards for Movies in 2013. He was also nominated as "Movie Supporting Actor of the Year".

Filmography

Television

Movies

References

External links

1991 births
Living people
Filipino male television actors
Male actors from Manila

TV5 (Philippine TV network) personalities
ABS-CBN personalities
Star Magic
GMA Network personalities